The Central District of Astara County is a district (bakhsh) in Astara County, Gilan Province, Iran. At the 2006 census, its population was 58,695, in 15,834 families.  The District has one city: Astara. The District has two rural districts (dehestan): Heyran Rural District and Virmuni Rural District.

References 

Astara County
Districts of Gilan Province